The 1996 Indian general election polls in United Andhra Pradesh were held for 42 seats in the state. The result was a victory for the Indian National Congress which won 22 out of 42 seats. This was the first election contested by the TDP since its leader Chandrababu Naidu ousted the party founder N. T. Rama Rao in a palace coup in August 1995 and the latter's untimely death a few months later.

United Andhra Pradesh

Voting and results

Results by alliance

See also 
Elections in Andhra Pradesh

References

External links
 Website of Election Commission of India
 CNN-IBN Lok Sabha Election History

Indian general elections in Andhra Pradesh
1990s in Andhra Pradesh
1996 Indian general election